Formaldehyde resin may refer to:
Melamine formaldehyde (MF)
Urea-formaldehyde (UF)
Phenol formaldehyde (PF)

See also 
 Formaldehyde (disambiguation)